Junior women's artistic individual all-around competition at the 2010 Summer Youth Olympics was held on August 19 at the Bishan Sports Hall.

For each competitor in the women's qualification, the scores in artistic gymnastics is based on two separate scores that are then combined in order to come to the final score. The A score measures the difficulty of each element (and combinations of elements) within the routine, while the B score evaluates the performance, i.e. the "execution, composition and artistry" of the routine. For further information, please see the Code of Points article. For all four apparatus were summed to give an all-around qualification score. The top 18 competitors moved on to the individual all-around final. In the individual all-around final, each gymnast competed on each apparatus again. Only scores from the final were used to determine final rankings.

Medalists

Qualification

Final round results

Reserves
The reserves for the All Around Final were:
 (19th place)
 (20th place)
 (21st place)
 (22nd place)

References

Gymnastics at the 2010 Summer Youth Olympics
Women's sports competitions in Singapore
2010 in women's gymnastics